Best Selection may refer to:

 Best Selection (Aimer album), 2017
 Best Selection 2010, an album by TVXQ, 2010
 Best Selection, an album by Japan, 1994
 Best Selection, an album by Jimsaku, 1995